Das Schloß Dürande, Op. 53, is an opera by Othmar Schoeck to a libretto by  based on  by Joseph von Eichendorff. A commission for Berlin by Werner Reinhart, the libretto was heavily weighted with the Nazi ideology of the librettist Bunte, putting the composer in conflict with his own Swiss nationalist feelings.

Recordings
Maria Cebotari, Peter Anders, Josef Greindl, Rut Berglund, Marta Fuchs, Willi Domgraf-Fassbaender, Orchester der Staatsoper Berlin, Robert Heger, 1943
Chorus, Konzert Theater Bern, Bern Symphony Orchestra, Mario Venzago; Claves Records 2018

References

1943 operas
Adaptations of works by Joseph von Eichendorff
Operas based on novels
Operas
Operas by Othmar Schoeck
German-language operas